Thomas LeRoy Beard Jr. (born June 10, 1948) is a former professional American football center who played with the Buffalo Bills in 1972. He was drafted by the Denver Broncos in the eighth round of the 1971 NFL Draft, and also played for the Lansing All Stars of the Midwest Football League (MFL) in 1971.

References

External links
Pro-Football-Reference.com statistics

1948 births
American football centers
Buffalo Bills players
Denver Broncos players
Living people
Michigan State Spartans football players
Midwest Football League (1962–1978) players
Players of American football from Ohio